The white-tailed mountain vole (Alticola albicauda) is a species of vole in the family Cricetidae. It is found in India and Pakistan.

References

Alticola
Rodents of Pakistan
Rodents of India
Mammals described in 1894
Taxonomy articles created by Polbot
Taxobox binomials not recognized by IUCN